Good Fences Make Good Neighbors was Ai Weiwei's 2017–18 citywide public art exhibition in New York City.

History 
The exhibit was sponsored by the Public Art Fund and included more than 300 artworks spread across the five boroughs of New York City. It was open to the public from October 12, 2017, to February 11, 2018.

References

Ai Weiwei
Public Art Fund works
Kickstarter-funded artworks